Alexandre Dias Paradeda (born 24 November 1972 in Porto Alegre), also known as Xandi or Careca, is a Brazilian sailor who competed in the Summer Olympic Games, the Pan American Games, the South American Games, the Snipe World Championships and the 470 World Championships.

Paradeda first major success came in 1987, when he won the Brazilian National Championship of the Optimist class. In 1992, he won again a national championship, this time the Brazilian National Championship of the Snipe class, and also the Snipe South American Championship crewing for his father Marco Aurélio Paradeda, earning a spot for the 1995 Pan American Games, where he finished 4th. In 1995, he won again the Snipe Brazilian National Championship (repeating top place in 1996, 1997, 1998, 2001, 2004, 2011, 2014, 2015, 2017, 2018 and 2019) and the Snipe South American Championship, already as a skipper (which he won again in 2009 and 2014).

In 1997, he entered 470 competition at the 470 World Championships in Tel Aviv, where he finished 10th. Next year, in 1998, at Mallorca, he took 16th place. In 1999, back on the Snipe class, he earned a silver medal at the 1999 Pan American Games, and in 2000 he went back to the 470 class competing at the Sydney 2000 Summer Olympics, where he placed 26th. His biggest success came in 2001, when he won the Snipe Worlds.

Back to the 470 class, he competed in the World Championships in Cagliari 2002, Cadiz 2003 and Zadar 2004. In 2004, he was 8th at the Athens Summer Olympics.

Again in the Snipe class, he became Western Hemisphere & Orient champion in 2004, won the gold medal at the 2007 Pan American Games and took 6th place in 2015. He finished second in 2011 and third in 2013 at the Snipe Worlds. In 2014, he won the gold medal at the South American Games.

Olympic Games
 26th place in 470 at Sydney 2000
 8h place in 470 at Athens 2004

Pan American Games
 4th place in Snipe at Mar del Plata 1995
 2nd place in Snipe at Winnipeg 1999
 1st place in Snipe at Rio de Janeiro 2007
 6th place in Snipe at Toronto 2015

References

Living people
1972 births
Brazilian male sailors (sport)
Competitors at the 2014 South American Games
Olympic sailors of Brazil
Pan American Games gold medalists for Brazil
Pan American Games medalists in sailing
Pan American Games silver medalists for Brazil
Sailors at the 1999 Pan American Games
Sailors at the 2000 Summer Olympics – 470
Sailors at the 2004 Summer Olympics – 470
Sailors at the 2007 Pan American Games
Sailors at the 2015 Pan American Games
Snipe class world champions
South American Champions Soling
South American Games gold medalists for Brazil
South American Games medalists in sailing
World champions in sailing for Brazil
Medalists at the 1999 Pan American Games
Medalists at the 2007 Pan American Games
Sportspeople from Porto Alegre